Lake Wollumboola is a  coastal lake in the Shoalhaven region of New South Wales, Australia. It lies to the immediate south of the town of Culburra Beach and to the north of Jervis Bay. It forms part of Jervis Bay National Park.

Birds
The lake has been identified by BirdLife International as an Important Bird Area (IBA) because it often supports over 1% of the world population of black swans, especially in drought years, as well as of chestnut teals.

References

Important Bird Areas of New South Wales
Wollumboola
City of Shoalhaven